The Sydney RiverCats are a class of catamarans operated by Transdev Sydney Ferries on the Parramatta River. They serve alongside HarbourCat class ferries.

History

Between 1992 and 1995, the State Transit Authority purchased seven RiverCats from NQEA Australia, Cairns to operate Parramatta River services. They replaced First Fleet class ferries on the Circular Quay to Meadowbank service, as well as allowing services to be extended to Parramatta wharf from 1993. They were named after famous Australian female athletes.

Although they primarily operate Parramatta River services, they on occasions operated Eastern Suburbs services.

On 16 February 2023 the first of the vessels, MV Betty Cuthbert, was retired from passenger service. The rest of the RiverCats are expected to retire in the coming years.

Vessels

See also
 List of Sydney Harbour ferries
 Timeline of Sydney Harbour ferries

References

External links

Catamarans
Ferry transport in Sydney
Ships built in Queensland
Ferry classes